Ruby Creek is a creek located in the Atlin Country region of British Columbia.  This creek flows into the north side of Lake Surprise about 3 miles to the east of Boulder Creek.  The creek has been mined and was discovered in 1898. The largest nugget recovered from the creek weighed just over 47 ounces on July 3, 1931.

References

External links
 

Rivers of British Columbia
Atlin District